Annovka is a rural locality (a village) in Zilairsky Selsoviet, Zilairsky District, Bashkortostan, Russia. The population was 132 as of 2010. There are 4 streets.

Geography 
Annovka is located 15 km south of Zilair (the district's administrative centre) by road. Vasilyevka is the nearest rural locality.

References 

Rural localities in Zilairsky District